The Reber Radio Telescope is a historic radio telescope, located at the Green Bank Observatory near Green Bank, West Virginia.  Built in 1937 in Illinois by astronomer Grote Reber, it is the first purpose-built parabolic radio telescope.  It was designated a National Historic Landmark in 1989.

Description and history
The Reber Radio Telescope is located on the grounds of the Green Bank Observatory (formerly part of the National Radio Astronomy Observatory) in rural Pocahontas County, West Virginia.

The telescope was built by astronomer Grote Reber in his back yard in Wheaton, Illinois in 1937, following up on the research of Karl Jansky, the discoverer (in 1933) of radio waves emanating from the Milky Way.   It was the second radio telescope ever built (after Jansky's dipole array), and the first parabolic radio telescope, serving as a prototype for the first large dish radio telescopes such as the Green Bank Telescope and Lovell Telescope constructed after World War II.  Reber was the world's only radio astronomer at the time, and his construction of the telescope and the sky surveys he did with it helped found the field of radio astronomy, revealing radio sources such as Cassiopeia A and Cygnus X-1 for the first time.

Reber sold the telescope to the US National Bureau of Standards and it was moved to Sterling, Virginia. It later became the property of the National Radio Astronomy Observatory (NRAO) and was moved to Boulder, Colorado, before being moved to the Green Bank facility.

It was listed on the National Register of Historic Places in 1972 and declared a National Historic Landmark in 1989.

See also
National Register of Historic Places listings in Pocahontas County, West Virginia
List of National Historic Landmarks in West Virginia

References

National Historic Landmarks in West Virginia
Buildings and structures in Pocahontas County, West Virginia
Astronomical observatories in West Virginia
Radio telescopes
National Register of Historic Places in Pocahontas County, West Virginia